Kim Sung-bae (born January 12, 1981) is South Korean professional baseball pitcher.

References

1981 births
Doosan Bears players
KBO League pitchers
Konkuk University alumni
Living people
Lotte Giants players
South Korean baseball players
Baseball players from Seoul